Glen E. Tullman is an American entrepreneur and investor who has built, run, and scaled businesses across a range of industries. He is the founder and executive chairman of Livongo Health, a consumer digital health company and previously served as the CEO of Allscripts.

Early life and education
Tullman was born circa 1960, near Chicago, Illinois and is the youngest of six children. He his family moved to the New York area when he was in fourth grade. Tullman received his undergraduate degree in 1981 in economics and psychology from Bucknell University. He also spent a year in Oxford, England studying social anthropology on a Rotary International fellowship through the Office of Management and Budget.

Career 
One of Tullman's first jobs after graduation was at Certified Collateral Corporation in Illinois where he worked for approximately 10 years. He also served as the CEO of Enterprise Systems, leading it through its initial public offering and eventual sale to McKesson Corporation.

In 1997, Tullman became the CEO of Allscripts, a large electronic health record and health information technology company. He was the CEO of the company for 15 years prior to leaving in 2012. Tullman was CEO of the company when it went public. After leaving Allscripts, Tullman co-founded and became the managing partner at 7Wire Ventures, a $100 million venture capital firm that is focused on investing in healthcare firms.

Tullman has invested in and/or co-founded more than 20 businesses throughout his career, including SoCore Energy, a commercial solar panel installation company that was later purchased by Edison International. He also founded a classroom technology company called Modern Teacher.

In 2014, Tullman founded Livongo, a digital health company that provides connected devices and health platforms for people with chronic conditions like diabetes, and other medical conditions; Tullman's son is diabetic and he saw a market need for such patients. The company went public in 2019. Livongo was sold to Teladoc for $18.5B in 2020. He resigned from the Teladoc board in 2020 to avoid any conflict of interest with his new company, Transcarent.

Tullman holds various executive positions outside of Transcarent. He serves on the board and is an investor in WiserTogether, a crowd sourced healthcare information company. He is Director Emeritus of JDRF, a board member of the American Diabetes Association, as well as a contributor to Forbes, through 2016. He also serves as executive chairman of ArgoTea, the co-founder and Vice Chairman of Cooler Screens, and owns Ignite Glass Studios, a venue featuring glassblowing classes, exhibits, and event space in Chicago.

Since 2021, Tullman has served as Chief Executive Officer and Founder of Transcarent, which sells an integrated healthcare benefits system bringing a new and different health and care experience to large and mid-sized self-insured employers, their employees and their families in the United States.

In 2021 Tullman was named a Forbes Healthcare Top 10 Leader of the Decade.

References

External links

American health care chief executives
Living people
Year of birth missing (living people)